Ed Williams may refer to:

 Ed Williams (actor), American actor
 Ed Williams (running back) (born 1950), American football running back
 Ed Williams (linebacker) (born 1961), American football linebacker
 Ed Williams (wide receiver) (born 1991), American football wide receiver
 Ed Williams (footballer) (born 1995), English footballer

See also
 Edward Williams (disambiguation)